Zavratnica is a 900 m long narrow inlet located at the foot of the Velebit 
Mountains, in the northern part of the Adriatic Sea, 1 km south of Jablanac, Croatia. Regarded as one of the major tourist attractions of the northern coastal area because of its beauty, Zavratnica was designated a protected landscape in 1964.

Description
Zavratnica is 50–150 m wide, with a narrow entrance, and up to 100 m sides which are very steep. It only resembles a fjord. Its geological origin is very different from the formation of fjords. A mountain stream became flooded as the surface of the sea rose (transgression after the last ice age), and so a cove was formed quite similar in appearance to a fjord.

See also
 Jablanac

References

External links
  
 Zavratnica bay on YouTube

Bodies of water of Croatia
Inlets of Europe
Adriatic Sea
Landforms of Lika-Senj County
Tourist attractions in Lika-Senj County